Erin Kelly may refer to:

 Erin Kelly (actress) (born 1981), American actress
 Erin Kelly (author) (born 1976), British journalist
 Erin Entrada Kelly, Filipino-American writer of children's literature
 Erin I. Kelly, American philosopher

See also
 Aaron Kelly (disambiguation)
 Erin Kellyman (born 1998), an English actress